The name Grüneberg, Grueneberg, or Gruneberg can refer to the following articles:

 Hans Grüneberg, a British scientist
 Hermann Julius Grüneberg, a German pharmacist and industrialist and founder of Chemische Fabrik Kalk 
 Grüneberg ganglion, an olfactory ganglion in rodents